Jason Evert is a Catholic author and chastity speaker.  He founded Totus Tuus Press and Chastity Project, an organization that promotes chastity primarily to high school and college students.

Evert earned a Master of Theology from the Franciscan University of Steubenville, with undergraduate degrees in theology and counseling, with a minor in philosophy.

He is married to Crystallina Evert, who is also a chastity speaker and runs Women Made New Ministries. Crystallina is the author of the books Pure Womanhood, How to Find Your Soulmate Without Losing Your Soul, and the curriculum YOU: Life, Love, and the Theology of the Body.

Bibliography 

 Pure Love (1999)
 If You Really Loved Me: 100 Questions on Dating, Relationships, and Sexual Purity (2009)
 Answering Jehovah's Witnesses (2006)
 Pure Manhood (2007)
 Theology of His Body/Theology of Her Body (2009)
 Pure Faith A Prayer Book for Teens (2009)
 Purity 365: Daily Reflections on True Love (2009)
 Raising Pure Teens (2010)
 Theology of the Body for Teens
 How to Find Your Soulmate Without Losing Your Soul (2011, with Crystallina Evert)
 Saint John Paul the Great: His Five Loves (2014)

References 

Living people
American Roman Catholic religious writers
Franciscan University of Steubenville alumni
Anti-pornography activists
1975 births